Lincoln Township is an inactive township in Christian County, Missouri. The township was named after Abraham Lincoln, the 16th President of the United States.

References

Townships in Missouri
Townships in Christian County, Missouri